Kate Kelly is a camogie player, winner of nine All-Star awards in 2004, 2006, 2007, 2010, 2011, 2012, 2013, 2015 and 2016. In 2007, she helped Wexford win their first All-Ireland Senior Camogie Championship in 32 years. and further All Ireland medals in 2010, 
2011 and 2012 when she was player of the match in the All Ireland final.

Family background
Daughter of Peggy (née Doyle), and niece of Mary, All-Ireland medal winners with Wexford in 1968 and 1969. she is a sister of Mag who was on the 2010-1 panel. Four of her brothers - Denis, Mick, John and Joe played with Wexford in various grades of hurling, while her father, Seán, is a former county under-age hurling mentor. Played in the All-Ireland Intermediate football final of 2007 and completed a notable double as she won the Wexford Supporters' Club player of the year for both camogie and football.

Other Honours
Vodafone camogie player of the year 2007; With Wexford she won National League medals in 2009, 2010 and 2011, and Leinster titles at senior, under-16 and minor level. She was nominated for further All Star awards in 2005, 2008 and 2009.  Wexford Supporters' Club camogie and ladies' football player of the year 2007; All-Ireland Under-16 1995; Leinster Under-14 1992, 1993, 1994; Leinster Under-16 1994, 1995, 1996; Leinster Under-18 1997 (captain), 1998; Leinster Senior 1999, 2000, 2001, 2003, 2004; two Ashbournes with WIT 1999, 2001 (captain); Leinster Centenary Ambassador 2004; Senior Gael Linn Cup with Leinster 2006; four Senior Club 1997, 1998, 2001, 2002; two Leinster Senior Club 2001, 2002; Leinster Senior 'B' Colleges with Loreto (Wexford) 1996; Purple and Gold Star 2008. She was a member of the Team of the Championship for 2011. She scored two goals  in Wexford's 3-12 to 1-11 victory over Kilkenny in the 2010 All Ireland semi-final.

References

Living people
Wexford camogie players
Year of birth missing (living people)
Alumni of Waterford Institute of Technology
Waterford IT camogie players